De Eneste To (literally The Only Two in Danish) is a successful Danish band consisting of two established musicians, Peter Sommer and Simon Kvamm. The band, which is also known by the acronym DET, was formed in 2010. In studio work and in live concerts, the duo's sound was accentuated with musical accompaniment by Stefan Kvamm (Simon Kvamm's brother) and Árni Bergmann. The duo has described their music as "industrial folk" and "singer-songwriter-techno".

Career
The duo's self-titled debut album was released on 11 October 2010. It peaked at No. 1 in Tracklisten, the official Danish Albums Chart, and was certified platinum. The follow-up release on 15 August 2011 was the Remix EP Det lyder radikalt which included remixes of songs from De eneste to from Filur, Carsten Heller, and Asger Baden among others. The EP made it into the Top 10. The duo appeared at popular festivals like Grøn Koncert and Roskilde Festival, simultaneously announcing that they were shelving the duo project, marking the end of the "first chapter". In August 2011, Peter Sommer announced that the duo had plans to release their next album in "two to four years". Keeping their promise, Dobbeltliv was released in 2014, and peaked at No. 3 on Tracklisten.

Award nominations
Despite the short span of the duo at that time (2010–2011), it was nominated for a great number of awards at the 2011 Danish Music Awards; for "Danish Album of the Year", "Songwriter of the Year", "Danish Group of the Year", "Best Danish Live Act" and "Audience Prize of the Year", the latter determined by the Danish public.

Discography

Albums

EPs

Singles

References

Danish pop music groups